Canalejas del Arroyo is a municipality in Cuenca, Castile-La Mancha, Spain. It has a population of 343.

References

External links

Municipalities in the Province of Cuenca